The FA Cup 1957–58 is the 77th season of the world's oldest football knockout competition; The Football Association Challenge Cup, or FA Cup for short. The large number of clubs entering the tournament from lower down the English football league system meant that the competition started with a number of preliminary and qualify]ing rounds. The 30 victorious teams from the Fourth Round Qualifying progressed to the First Round Proper.

Preliminary round

Ties

Replays

2nd replays

1st qualifying round

Ties

Replays

2nd replay

2nd qualifying round

Ties

Replays

3rd qualifying round

Ties

Replays

4th qualifying round
The teams that given byes to this round are Bedford Town, Peterborough United, Wigan Athletic, Burton Albion, Yeovil Town, Walthamstow Avenue, Weymouth, Rhyl, Hereford United, Blyth Spartans, Hastings United, Guildford City, Selby Town, Newport I O W, Boston United, Scarborough, Dorchester Town, Goole Town, South Shields, Tooting & Mitcham United, Billingham Synthonia, New Brighton, Bromsgrove Rovers and Margate.

Ties

Replays

2nd replay

1957–58 FA Cup
See 1957-58 FA Cup for details of the rounds from the First Round Proper onwards.

External links
 Football Club History Database: FA Cup 1957–58
 FA Cup Past Results

Qualifying
FA Cup qualifying rounds